San Haven was the name of a state hospital and tuberculosis sanatorium 2.5 miles northeast of  Dunseith, Rolette County, in the U.S. state of North Dakota.

History
The name San Haven was probably derived from "sanatorium" and "haven"  The San Haven Sanatorium was built in 1912, but due to the number of patients flooding in, the place closed in 1987. A post office called San Haven was established in 1923, and remained in operation until it was discontinued in 1987. The building was changed to an asylum during the 60s after the vaccine was found for tuberculosis and special or ‘Retarded’ patients were treated in the place. In the 80s patients weren't taken care of well enough so they closed the building in 1987, because there were over 400 patients. San Haven land is now owned by the Turtle Mountain Band of Chippewa.

A 17-year-old boy, who was trespassing, went there to hunt for ghosts and accidentally slipped at the edge of an elevator shaft, tumbling 40 ft. (12 m.) to his death on October 13, 2001.

See also
North Dakota State Hospital

References

Unincorporated communities in Rolette County, North Dakota
Unincorporated communities in North Dakota